Glen Kelly (born 8 March 1971 in La Perouse, New South Wales) is an Indigenous Australian professional boxer. The pinnacle of Kelly's boxing career came in 2002, when he unsuccessfully challenged Roy Jones Jr for the WBC, WBA, IBF, IBO, WBF and IBA light heavyweight World titles. Kelly, who came in undefeated, was knocked out in the seventh round.

Career
Kelly won the New South Wales light-heavyweight title in 1996, before winning the Australian Light Heavyweight title the following year and the IBF Pan Pacific light heavyweight title (against Anthony Bigeni) in 1999. he defended them titles against Sam Soliman before relinquished his Australian titles to fight in USA, beating Billy Lewis for the IBF Inter-Continental light heavyweight title in 2000. Kelly then moved to be trained by former world champion, Jeff Fenech. His biggest fight was against Roy Jones Jr. for the WBC, WBA, IBF, IBO, WBF and IBA light heavyweight World titles in 2002.  Kelly was outclassed by Jones, being knocked out in the seventh round. His final fight was against David Haye in 2005 which he lost by TKO in the 2nd round.

Professional boxing record

Personal life
His brother is also a professional boxer Kevin Kelly

he is married to Tracy Kelly and they have 5 kids together. they have been together for over 20 years.

References

External links

Indigenous Australian boxers
Boxers from Sydney
Living people
1971 births
Australian male boxers
Cruiserweight boxers
Light-heavyweight boxers